The Provincial Secretary and Registrar of Ontario was a senior position in the provincial cabinet of Ontario from before Canadian Confederation until the 1960s.

The Provincial Secretary and Registrar was originally the second highest position in the provincial cabinet, equivalent to the position of Deputy Premier. The Provincial Secretary was the equivalent of the former Canadian Cabinet position of Secretary of State for Canada. Like its federal counterpart it included an eclectic variety of responsibilities that were not assigned to other ministers, most of which would eventually evolve into portfolios of their own. The provincial secretary was also responsible for official communications between the provincial government and the Colonial Office in London as well as with other provincial and colonial governments (and after 1867 the federal government). As well, the position also included various duties related to ceremonial occasions, visits by dignitaries, protocol, relations between the government and the office of lieutenant governor and commemorative events particularly in relation to the monarchy.

Generally, the Provincial Secretary acted as a province's Registrar-General and was responsible for formal documents and records such as licences, birth and death certificates, land registries and surveys, business registrations and writs. As well, the position was generally responsible for the administration of the civil service and of elections. Provincial secretaries were usually the most senior member of the provincial cabinet outside of the Premier, and the office holder was often designated as Acting Premier when the Premier was out of province, ill or otherwise unavailable. The last individual to hold the position of Provincial Secretary and Registrar (renamed Provincial Secretary and Minister of Citizenship in 1961) was John Yaremko who left office in 1975.

In 1972 the Progressive Conservative government of Bill Davis adopted the provincial secretary title for a non-departmental cabinet portfolio in which the occupant either having responsibility spreading over several ministries, assisting a senior minister in an area or as a secondary portfolio for a senior minister giving him a broader responsibility or mandate area. The three positions created were Provincial Secretary for Social Development, Provincial Secretary for Justice and Provincial Secretary for Resource Development. These positions were unrelated to the original Provincial Secretary position except for the common name. The positions were retained by Davis' successor, Frank Miller, in 1985 but were abolished when the Progressive Conservatives lost power to David Peterson's Liberals in 1985.

Pre-Confederation Provincial Secretary
Prior to Confederation and the creation of the office of Premier, the Provincial Secretary was the most important and powerful figure in provincial politics. The title holder was appointed by the Lieutenant Governor and many sat as members of the Legislative Council.

Upper Canada
 William Jarvis (1791-1817) Family Compact (Conservative)
 Sir John Robinson, 1st Baronet, of Toronto (1817-1829) Family Compact (Conservative)
 Robert Baldwin Sullivan (1838-1840)

United Provinces of Canada
 Sir Dominick Daly (1844-1848) - former Provincial Secretary of Lower Canada (1827-1840), Canada East (1843-1844)
 Pierre Joseph Olivier Chauveau (1853-1854) Conservative
 Sir George-Étienne Cartier (1855-1857) Conservative

Provincial Secretary and Registrar
Matthew Crooks Cameron (1867-1871) Conservative
Stephen Richards (1871) Conservative
Alexander Mackenzie (1871) Liberal
Peter Gow (1871-1872) Liberal
Timothy Pardee (1872-1873) Liberal
Christopher Fraser (1873) Liberal
Samuel Wood (1875-1877) Liberal
Arthur S. Hardy (1877-1889) Liberal
John Gibson (1889-1896) Liberal
William Balfour (1896) Liberal
Elihu Davis (1896-1899) Liberal
James Stratton (1899-1904) Liberal
George Graham (1904-1905) Liberal
William Hanna (1905-1916) Conservative
William McPherson (1916-1919) Conservative
Harry Nixon (1919-1923) United Farmers of Ontario
Lincoln Goldie (1923-1930) Conservative
Leopold Macaulay (1930-1931) Conservative
George Challies (1931-1934) Conservative
Harry Nixon (1934-1942) Liberal
Norman Hipel (1942-1943) Liberal
Harry Nixon (1943) as Premier Liberal
George Dunbar (1943-1946) Progressive Conservative
Roland Michener (1946-1948) Progressive Conservative
Dana Porter (1948-1949) Progressive Conservative
George Welsh (1949-1955) Progressive Conservative
William Nickle (1955) Progressive Conservative
George Dunbar (1955-1958) Progressive Conservative
Mac Phillips (1958-1960) Progressive Conservative
John Yaremko (1960-1961) Progressive Conservative

The Registrar General of Ontario eventually transferred to the Ministry of Government Services in 1972.

Provincial Secretary and Minister of Citizenship
John Yaremko (1961-1966) Progressive Conservative
Robert Welch (1966-1971) Progressive Conservative
John Yaremko (1971-1972) Progressive Conservative

After 1972 the responsibility of Citizenship affairs was transferred to the Ministry of Citizenship and Culture when it was formed in 1982.

Provincial Secretaries for Social Development
Robert Welch (1972-1974)
Margaret Birch (1974-1983)
Bruce McCaffrey (while Minister of Community and Social Services) (1983)
Gordon Dean (1983-1985)
Larry Grossman (1985)

Provincial Secretaries for Justice
Allan Lawrence (1972)
George Kerr (1972-1974)
Robert Welch (while Attorney-General) (1974-1975)
John Clement (while Attorney-General and Solicitor General) (1975)
John MacBeth (1975-1978)
George Kerr (while Solicitor-General) (1978)
Gordon Walker (1979-1982)
Norm Sterling (1982-1983)
Reuben Baetz (1985)

Provincial Secretaries for Resource Development
Albert Lawrence (1972-1974)
Allan Grossman (1974-1975)
Donald Irvine (1975-1977)
René Brunelle (1977-1981)
Russ Ramsay (1981-1982)
Lorne Henderson (1982-1983)
Norm Sterling (1983-1985)
Ernie Eves (1985)

See also

 Ministry of Government Services (Ontario) - current ministry where the Registrar of Ontario resides
 Provincial Secretary of Quebec

Political history of Ontario
Defunct Ontario government departments and agencies

1975 disestablishments in Ontario
1867 establishments in Ontario